Acroceuthes leucozancla is a species of moth of the family Tortricidae. It is found in Australia, where it has been recorded from Queensland.

References

Moths described in 1945
Archipini
Moths of Australia
Taxa named by Alfred Jefferis Turner